Matthew McNair Carnahan (born February 6, 1961) is an American producer, writer and director.

Career
Valley of the Boom is a six-part American docudrama television miniseries, created, directed, and executive produced by Carnahan. It premiered on January 13, 2019, on National Geographic.

Personal life
Carnahan studied at New York University, as well as the Neighborhood Playhouse School of the Theatre.

He has a son, Emmett Carnahan (b. 1998) from a previous relationship and daughter, Mákena Lei Gordon Carnahan (born 2004) with actress and longtime partner Helen Hunt.  In August 2017, the couple split after 16 years together.

Filmography
 Valley of the Boom (2019) TV Series (writer, director, executive producer)
 Ride (2014) (producer)
 House of Lies (2012–16) TV Series (creator, executive producer, writer)
 Dirt (2007–08) TV Series (creator, executive producer, writer, director)
 Fastlane (2002) TV Series (writer, producer)
 Thieves (2001) TV Series (writer, producer)
 Rudyland (2001) (producer, director)
 The Fugitive (2000) TV Series (consulting producer)
 Trinity (1998) TV Series (creator, writer, producer)
 Black Circle Boys (1997) (writer, director)
 Mailman (director)

Bibliography
 Serpent Girl (2005)

References

External links
 

1961 births
Living people
American film producers
American male screenwriters
American film directors
Tisch School of the Arts alumni
Showrunners
Place of birth missing (living people)
American male television writers